Trinacromerum is an extinct genus of sauropterygian reptile, a member of the polycotylid plesiosaurs. It contains two species, T. bentonianum and T. kirki. Specimens have been discovered in the Late Cretaceous fossil deposits of what is now modern Kansas and Manitoba.

Description

Its teeth show that it fed on small fish.

The long flippers of Trinacromerum enabled it to achieve high swimming speeds. Its physical appearance was described by Richard Ellis as akin to a "four-flippered penguin." Its name means "three tipped femur".

Classification
 

Below is a cladogram of polycotylid relationships from Ketchum & Benson, 2011.

See also

 List of plesiosaur genera
 Timeline of plesiosaur research

References

External links
 PaleoDB entry on Manitoba discovery

Late Cretaceous plesiosaurs of North America
Polycotylids
Sauropterygian genera